A monomotor is a train design where a single traction motor powers two or three axles in the same bogie. Conventional bogie design involves either having one motor for each axle, or having one or more axles unpowered. The monomotor design causes the motor to give both axles the same number of revolutions per minute.

Advantages
The monomotor design makes it relatively easy to fit a locomotive with two-speed gearing.  Low gear is used when hauling freight trains and high gear is used when hauling express passenger trains.

Potential problems
When both axle's wheels are equally worn, this gives good operating conditions but, as soon as one of the wheels becomes slightly more worn (as is inevitable with steel wheels on steel rails), there will be slippage which causes wear and waste of energy. The problem can be countered by keeping the wheels regularly ground to the same diameter.

References

External links
 Diagram of monomotor bogie

Bogie
Electric motors
Locomotive parts